XOYO is a nightclub in London. It is located on Cowper Street near Old Street station in Islington.

History 
The two-room club opened in 2010, occupying a converted print works. It was bought and renovated by The Columbo Group.

Eats Everything became the club's first resident in January 2015.

In November 2014, XOYO launched Gloria's, a mixed gay and straight night, alongside polysexual East London collective Sink the Pink.

Accolades 
XOYO was voted one of the world's top 100 clubs by DJ Mag in 2020.

References

External links 
 

Nightclubs in London
Music venues completed in 2010
Tourist attractions in the London Borough of Islington
Electronic dance music venues
2010 establishments in England